The 2020 Premios Juventud ceremony was held on August 13, 2020. Univision broadcast the show live from the Seminole Hard Rock Hotel & Casino Hollywood in Hollywood, Florida. Premios Juventud aims to inspire, motivate and empower Latino youth to become leaders for change. The awards celebrate the current trends in pop culture, music, digital, fashion, television and social media. Sebastián Yatra, Ana Patricia Gámez, Francisca Lachapel, Julissa Calderon and Borja Voces hosted the event.

Performers
Mexican-American singer Ally Brooke, Dominican singer Natti Natasha, Colombian singer Greeicy Rendón and Mexican singer Danna Paola paid tribute to late tejano superstar Selena, in commemoration of the 25 years since her death.

Winners and nominees
Winners are written in bold.

Triple Threat
 Social Media platforms, television, film or music
Juanpa Zurita
Danileigh
Isabela Merced
Luisa Fernanda W
Mario Bautista

Producer you know by Shout-Out
Chris Jedi & Gaby Music
Dimelo Flow
DJ Snake
Play-N-Skillz
Ovy On The Drums
Sky Rompiendo
Steve Aoki
Subelo Neo
Tainy
Will.I.Am

Spicy Regional Songs
"Amor tumbado’" - Natanael Cano
"Cosas de la clica’" - Herencia de Patrones
"El amor no fue pa' mí" - Grupo Firme ft. Banda Coloso
"El circo" - El Fantasma
"Yo ya no vuelvo contigo" - Lenin Ramírez ft. Grupo Firme

Can't Get Enough Of This Song
"Tusa" - Karol G ft. Nicki Minaj
"Mi Meta Contigo" - Banda Los Sebastianes
"Pegao" - CNCO ft. Manuel Turizo
"Ritmo (Bad Boys For Life)" - Black Eyed Peas & J Balvin
"Se me olvidó" - Christian Nodal

And Featuring...
J Balvin
Daddy Yankee
Natti Natasha
Manuel Turizo
Anuel AA

This Choreo Is On Fire
"Que Tire Pa Lante" - Daddy Yankee
"Aguardiente" - Greeicy
"Amarillo" - J Balvin
Bogaloo supreme" - Victor Manuelle y Wisin
"Whine up" - Nicky Jam y Anuel AA

Best LOL Award
Louie Castro
Alex Guzman
Gadiel del Orbe
Lejuan James
Salice Rose

Video With A Purpose
"Rojo" - J Balvin
"Aleluya" - Reik y Manuel Turizo
"Me estás matando" - Natti Natasha
"No ha parado de llover" - Maná y Sebastián Yatra
"Tiburones" - Ricky Martin

Together They Fire Up My Feed
Karol G y Anuel AA
Camila Cabello y Shawn Mendes
Nicky Jam y Cydney Moreau
Rosalía y Kylie Jenner
Sebastián Yatra y Mau y Ricky

Trendsetter
Bad Bunny
Billie Eilish
Cazzu
J Balvin
Sofía Reyes

Nailed It
Has the best "Manicute" 
Bad Bunny
Billie Eilish
Cardi B
Karol G
Rosalía

#Stay Home Concert
Sech – ‘#YouTubeAndChill concert’
Alejandro Sanz & Juanes – ‘#LaGiraSeQuedaEnCasa’
Carlos Vives – ‘#NoTeVayasDeTuCasa El show de Carlos Vives’
Christian Nodal – ‘Juntos por la música #StayHome #WithMe #QuédateEnCasa’
Gerardo Ortiz – ‘Juntos por la música #StayHome #WithMe #QuédateEnCasa’

The New Regional Mexican Generation
Natanael Cano
Alex Fernández
Carin León
Grupo Firme
Neto Bernal

Name a Better Duo
Juanpa Zurita & Mario Ruiz
Analisse Rodriguez & Kat Rodríguez
Calle y Poché
Karen González & Sebastián Robles
Martínez Twins

The Quarentune
‘En casita’ - Bad Bunny ft. Gabriela
‘Cuando amanezca’ - Nibal, Justin Quiles, Danny Ocean, Feid
‘El mundo fuera’ - Alejandro Sanz
‘El tiempo pasa (Cuarentena)’ - Farruko, Sharo Towers, Andy Cay & Alex AC
‘Es hora de unirnos’ - Banda MS de Sergio Lizárraga
‘Esta cuarentena’ - Abraham Mateo
‘I believe that we will win’ - Pitbull
‘Resistencia’ - Kendo Kaponi
‘Tomar distancia’ - Piso 21
‘Color esperanza (2020)’ - Artistas múltiples: Diego Torres, Nicky Jam, Reik, Camilo, Farruko, Rubén Blades, Camila, Carlos Vives, Mau y Ricky, Thalía, Leslie Grace, Rauw Alejandro, Prince Royce, Pedro Capó, Kany García, Leonel Garcia, Río Roma, Diego El Cigala, Jorge Villamizar, Carlos Rivera, Ivete Sangalo, Coti Sorokin, Lali, Gente de Zona, Fonseca, Dani Martín, Manuel Turizo, Ángela Torres, Ara Malikian, Dilsinho

The Traffic Jam
‘China’ - Anuel AA ft. Daddy Yankee, Ozuna, Karol G & J Balvin
‘Escondidos’ - La Adictiva
‘Me quedaré contigo’ - Pitbull X Ne-Yo ft. Lenier & El Micha
‘No elegí conocerte’ - Banda MS de Sergio Lizárraga
‘Que tire pa' 'lante’ - Daddy Yankee

#Pet Goals
Karol G y Anuel AA con Goku
El Dasa con Benito
Frida Sofía con Phillippe
J Balvin con Paz y Felicidad
Maluma con Bonnie y Clyde

Influencer With A Cause
Canelo Álvarez
Edwin Castro
Indya Moore
Jessica y JP Domínguez
Julissa Calderón

Hair Obsessed
J Balvin
Amara La Negra
Camilo
Jennifer Lopez
Pabllo Vittar

Sneakerhead
Bad Bunny
De La Ghetto
Karol G
J Balvin
Rosalía

Breaking the Internet
Lunay
Chiquis Rivera
Karol G
Maluma
Natti Natasha

High Fashion
Bad Bunny
Jennifer Lopez
Maluma
Sofía Carson
Thalía

OMG Collaboration
Natanael Cano & Bad Bunny – ‘Soy el diablo (remix)’
Banda MS De Sergio Lizárraga & Snoop Dogg – ‘Qué maldición’
Reykon & Willie Colón – ‘Perriando (La murga remix)’
Shakira & Anuel AA – ‘Me gusta’
T3r Elemento & Farruko – ‘Del barrio a la ciudad’

The New Generation - Female
Cazzu
Emilia
Jessie Reyez
Mariah Angeliq
Yennis

Scroll Stopper
Bad Bunny
Cardi B
Guaynaa
Sebastián Yatra
Thalía

The Perfect Mix
‘China’ - Anuel AA ft. Daddy Yankee, Ozuna, Karol G & J Balvin
‘Indeciso’ - Reik, J Balvin & Lalo Ebratt
‘Pegao’ - CNCO ft. Manuel Turizo
‘Qué maldición’ - Banda MS de Sergio Lizárraga ft. Snoop Dogg
‘Qué pena’ - Maluma ft. J Balvin

The New Generation - Male
Lunay
El Alfa
Jhay Cortez
Myke Towers
Rauw Alejandro

Can't Get Enough
Bad Bunny
Frida Sofía
Jennifer Lopez
Karol G
Sebastián Yatra

References

2019 music awards
2019 awards in the United States
2019 in Latin music